Galina Mityaeva (born 29 April 1991 in Shahrtuz, Khatlon) is a Tajikistani hammer thrower. Mityaeva represented Tajikistan at the 2008 Summer Olympics in Beijing, where she competed for the women's hammer throw. She performed the best throw of 51.38 metres on her third and final attempt, finishing forty-seventh overall in the qualifying rounds.

References

External links

NBC Olympics Profile

1991 births
Living people
Tajikistani female hammer throwers
Olympic athletes of Tajikistan
Athletes (track and field) at the 2008 Summer Olympics
Athletes (track and field) at the 2006 Asian Games
People from Khatlon Region
Tajikistani people of Russian descent
Asian Games competitors for Tajikistan